Ilyes Chetti (born 22 January 1995) is an Algerian professional footballer who plays as a left-back for Angers in the Ligue 1.

Career statistics

Club

Honours
ES Tunis
Tunisian Ligue Professionnelle 1: 2019–20, 2020–21, 2021–22
Tunisian Super Cup: 2020–21

Algeria
FIFA Arab Cup: 2021

References

External links
 

1995 births
Living people
Algerian footballers
Association football defenders
Algeria international footballers
Ligue 1 players
Algerian Ligue Professionnelle 1 players
Tunisian Ligue Professionnelle 1 players
USM Annaba players
US Chaouia players
JS Kabylie players
Espérance Sportive de Tunis players
Angers SCO players
Algerian expatriate footballers
Algerian expatriate sportspeople in Tunisia
Expatriate footballers in Tunisia
Algerian expatriate sportspeople in France
Expatriate footballers in France
21st-century Algerian people